Ajit Johnson Nirmal is a cancer geneticist. He has also campaigned to raise awareness on tech addiction and net neutrality.

Education 
Born in Vellore, Johnson graduated with a bachelor's degree in biotechnology at Karunya University. Johnson graduated from University College London in 2011 and worked at the Indian Institute of Science. He earned a Doctor of Philosophy in cancer genetics and genomics from the University of Edinburgh and performed his post-doctoral work at Harvard Medical School and Dana Farber Cancer Institute.

Career

Research 
Johnson and colleagues developed a cell based gene therapy for haemophilia patients at the National Cancer Centre Singapore. Johnson developed ImSig, a network-based computational framework that facilitates the characterization of immune cells within the tumor microenvironment.

References

External links 
 Official website: www.ajitjohnson.com

1988 births
Living people
Indian biotechnologists
People from Vellore
Computational biologists
Cancer researchers
People from Harvard, Massachusetts